The Costa Book Award for Children's Book, formerly known as the Whitbread Award (1971-2006), was an annual literary award for children's books, part of the Costa Book Awards, which were discontinued in 2022, the 2021 awards being the last made.

Recipients 
Costa Books of the Year are distinguished with a bold font and a blue ribbon. Award winners are listed in bold.

See also 

 Costa Book Award for Biography
 Costa Book Award for First Novel
 Costa Book Award for Novel
 Costa Book Award for Poetry
 Costa Book Award for Short Story
 Costa Book Awards

References

External links 

 Official website

Awards established in 1971
English-language literary awards
Costa Book Awards